Glaciecola nitratireducens is a psychrophilic bacteria. It is Gram-negative, aerobic, rod-shaped, motile and halophilic. Its type strain is FR1064(T) (=KCTC 12276(T)=JCM 12485(T)). Its genome has been sequenced.

References

Further reading
Yumoto, Isao, ed. Cold-adapted Microorganisms. Horizon Scientific Press, 2013.

External links
LPSN

Alteromonadales
Bacteria described in 2006
Halophiles